Eslamabad District is in Parsabad County, Ardabil province, Iran. At the 2006 and 2011 censuses, the district's constituent villages were a part of the former Qeshlaq-e Shomali Rural District of the Central District. At the latest census in 2016, the district had 13,944 inhabitants living in 3,973 households, by which time Eslamabad District had been established with the city of Eslamabad and two rural districts.

References 

Parsabad County

Districts of Ardabil Province

Populated places in Ardabil Province

Populated places in Parsabad County

fa:بخش اسلام‌آباد